Estréelles is a commune in the Pas-de-Calais department in the Hauts-de-France region of France.

Geography
A village situated some 3 miles (5 km) northeast of Montreuil-sur-Mer at the D127 road.

Population

Places of interest
 The seventeenth century church of Saint Omer
 The former Protestant church of the late 15th century, which was demolished in 1970. Foundations of chequered sandstone and carved flint are all that remain.

See also
Communes of the Pas-de-Calais department

References

Communes of Pas-de-Calais